The title Grand Duke of Bosnia was a court title in the Kingdom of Bosnia, bestowed by the King to highest military commanders, usually reserved for most influential and most capable among highest Bosnian nobility. To interpret it as an office post rather than a court rank could be more accurate.

Grand Dukes of Bosnia

See also 
List of dukes of Bosnia
List of rulers of Bosnia
List of Bosnian consorts

References 

g